The Garabí Dam is a planned dam and generating station on the Uruguay River between Argentina and Brazil, part of the Garabí-Panambi Hydroelectric Complex. 
There is some controversy over the environmental impact on the fast-flowing river.

Location

The dam would be built in the Corrientes provinces of Argentina, and the Garruchos municipality of Rio Grande do Sul in Brazil.
The exact location would depend on the results of geological studies of the sites.
The project is a joint venture of Eletrobras of Brazil and Emprendimientos Energéticos Binacionales (Ebisa) of Argentina.

Technical

The two machine houses would share a common tunnel in the bed of the river.
As of March 1986 the estimated cost was US$1,357 million. By December 1994 the estimate had been revised to US$1,789 million.

As of 2016 the estimated cost was US$2,728 million.

Planning and approval process

Proposed hydroelectric exploitation of the Uruguay River has a long history.
In a convention between Argentina and Brazil signed on 14 March 1972 three sites were selected: Roncador, or Panambí, with 2,700MW, Garabi with 1,800MW and San Pedro with 1,700MW.
Arguments in favor of the projects were that they would support development of the local and regional economies, would help make the two countries independent of external energy suppliers using a renewable resource, and would avoid using hard currency resources.
In 2003 the Garabí Dam, which would flood  in southern Misiones, was still on hold, as was the Roncador/Panambí dam.

Brazil and Argentina signed an agreement in 2005 for two possible dams, the Garabí Dam with 1,150MW and the Panambí Dam with 1,050MW.
Eletrobras and EBISA were to undertake the project, expected to be completed by 2013, although it had met some local opposition.
In November 2007 the Brazilian head of state Luiz Inácio Lula da Silva and his Argentinian counterpart Cristina Fernández de Kirchner agreed to prioritize construction of the Garabí binational dam.
Next day the planning ministers of Brazil and Argentina endorsed these agreements on exchange of energy.
The governments of Corrientes and Rio Grande do Sul wanted to implement the Garabí Binational Project as quickly as possible.

A cooperation agreement was signed in Rio de Janeiro on 1 September 2008 between Emprendimientos Energéticos Binacionales S.A. (EBISA) and Centrais Elétricas Brasileiras S.A. (ELETROBRAS).
The hydroelectric inventory study was concluded in 2010, recommending the Garabí have 1,152 MW with a  reservoir.
The environmental and engineering studies and social communications plan were started in May 2013, as well as the technical bidding documents.
In February 2014 the Brazilian Institute of Environment and Renewable Natural Resources (IBAMA) approved the terms of reference for rescuing the fauna.
The survey was to start in April 2014.
Studies were expected to be completed by the end of 2016.

Notes

Sources

Dams in Argentina
Dams in Rio Grande do Sul
Proposed hydroelectric power stations
Proposed renewable energy power stations in Argentina
Proposed renewable energy power stations in Brazil